The GiMA Best Music Debut is given by Global Indian Music Academy as a part of its annual Global Indian Music Academy Awards.

List of winners
 2010 Swanand Kirkire for "Behti Hawa Sa Tha Woh"  – 3 Idiots (as lyricist)
 Alyssa Mendonsa for "Uff Teri Adaa" - Karthik Calling Karthik (as singer)
 2011 Mamta Sharma for "Munni Badnaam Hui"  – Dabangg (as singer)
 Bhadwai Village Mandal for "Mehngayi Dayain" - Peepli Live (as composer)
 Krsna for "Rangrez" - Tanu Weds Manu (as music director)
 Lehmber Hussainpuri for "Sadi Gali" - Tanu Weds Manu (as singer)
 Sanjay Leela Bhansali for "Guzaarish" - Guzaarish (as composer)
 2012 Kamal Khan for "Ishq Sufiyana"  – The Dirty Picture (as singer)
 Ayushmann Khurrana for "Pani Da Rang" - Vicky Donor (as singer)
 Ayushmann Khurrana, Rochak Kohli for "Pani Da Rang" - Vicky Donor (as music composer and lyricist)
 Harshit Saxena for "Hale Dil" - Murder 2 (as music composer)
 Sunil Bhatia for "Chu Chu Acoustic" - Saheb Biwi Aur Gangster (as music composer)
 2014 Ankit Tiwari for "Sunn Raha Hai"  – Aashiqui 2 (as music composer and singer)
 Nirali Kartik for " 	Torey Matwaare Naina" - David (as singer)
 Mili Nair for "Meethi Boliyaan" - Kai Po Che! (as singer)
 Osman Mir for "Mor Bani Thanghat" - Goliyon Ki Raasleela Ram-Leela (as singer)
 Smita Nair Jain for "Issaq Tera" - Issaq (as singer)
 2015 Armaan Malik for "Auliya" – Ungli (as a singer) and Sultana and Jyoti Nooran for "Pataka Guddi" – Highway (as a singer)
 Kanika Kapoor for "Baby Doll" – Ragini MMS 2 (as singer)
 Mukhtiyar Ali for "Fanny Re" – Finding Fanny (as singer)
 Shraddha Kapoor for "Galliyan" – Ek Villain (as singer)
 Sultana & Jyoti Nooran for "Pataka Guddi" - Highway (as singer) 
 2016 Ami Mishra for "Hasi" – Hamari Adhuri Kahani (as music composer)
 Anupam Roy for "Piku" – Piku (as music composer)
 Neeraj Rajawat "Maati Ka Palang"  – NH10 (as lyricist)
 Swati Sharma for "Banno" – Tanu Weds Manu Returns (as singer)
 Tanishk-Vayu for "Banno" - Tanu Weds Manu Returns (as music composer)

See also
 Bollywood
 Cinema of India

References

Global Indian Music Academy Awards